The Nitrobacteraceae are a family of gram-negative, aerobic bacteria. They include plant-associated bacteria such as Bradyrhizobium, a genus of rhizobia associated with some legumes. It also contains animal-associated bacteria such as Afipia felis, formerly thought to cause cat-scratch disease. Others are free-living, such as Rhodopseudomonas, a purple bacterium found in marine water and soils. The strain Rhodopseudomonas palustris DX-1 can generate an electric current with no hydrogen production, a trait  being explored in the development of the microbial fuel cell. The genus Afipia has also been found in the atmosphere, where it uses methylsulfonylmethane as a carbon source.

The bacteria of this family derive their energy from oxidizing ammonia to nitrite, or by oxidizing nitrite to nitrate. They are commonly found in freshwater and soil.

Phylogeny
The currently accepted taxonomy is based on the List of Prokaryotic names with Standing in Nomenclature (LPSN). The phylogeny is based on whole-genome analysis.

See also 
 Nitrogen cycle
 Nitrite
 Nitrate

References

External links 
 J.P. Euzéby: List of Prokaryotic names with Standing in Nomenclature - Family Nitrobacteraceae - cict.fr
 Nitrobacteraceae - discoverlife.org
 Nitrobacteraceae, Taxonomic Serial No.: 56 - Integrated Taxonomic Information System
 Nitrobacteraceae - online-medical-dictionary.org
 Taxonomic Considerations of the Family Nitrobacteraceae Buchanan - sgmjournals.org

Nitrobacteraceae